Jeongin Food (hangul: 정인식품) is a South Korean company headquartered in Busan, South Korea. Established in 1998, they manufacture several types of nurungji (hangul:누룽지), a traditional Korean food made of scorched rice.

The company exports its products to the United States, Canada, Japan, China, Taiwan, Hong Kong, other Asian-Pacific nations, Europe, and other nations worldwide.

Products
Fast Nurungji (즉석 누룽지)
Environ Nurungji (친환경 누룽지)
Rice Nurungji (찹쌀 누룽지)
Black Rice Nurungji (흑미 누룽지)

See also
Nurungji
Economy of South Korea

External links
Jeongin Food Homepage (in Korean)

Food and drink companies established in 1998
Food and drink companies of South Korea
Food manufacturers of South Korea
South Korean companies established in 1998
Manufacturing companies based in Busan